Babu M. Palissery is a member of Communist Party of India (Marxist) from Thrissur and
ex-Member of the Kerala Legislative Assembly from Kunnamkulam Assembly
Constituency. He was elected for two consecutive terms between 2006 and 2016 from Kunnamkulam Assembly.

Personal life

Babu M. Palissery, born Sankaranarayan, is the eldest son of Chinnapan Nair and Amminiyamma. He has 4 siblings named Aniyan, Balaji, Thankamol and Raji. At the age of 38, he married Indira and they have two children, Aswathy Palissery and Akhil Palissery. In 2006 Kerala Legislative Assembly election he beat his opponent by 21,785 votes. In 2011 Kerala State Legislative Assembly election he beat his opponent CP John to become the Member of Kerala Legislative Assembly from Kunnamkulam for the second time.

References

Communist Party of India (Marxist) politicians from Kerala
Malayali politicians
Politicians from Thrissur
Living people
Members of the Kerala Legislative Assembly
1958 births